Tower Millennium Pier is a pier on the River Thames, in Tower Hill, London, England. It is operated by London River Services and served by various river transport and cruise operators. The pier is close to Tower Bridge and is situated immediately adjacent to the southwest corner of the Tower of London.

Services
The pier is used by the river bus route RB1 from Embankment to Woolwich (operated by Thames Clippers) and Westminster-Greenwich tourist boats (operated by City Cruises). Private-charter entertainment boats also use Tower Pier.

History

Tower Millennium Pier was opened on 14 July 2000 by London Mayor Ken Livingstone. It was funded by the Millennium Commission as part of the Thames 2000 project, and was one of five new piers provided by the Commission on the Thames (the others being Blackfriars Millennium Pier, London Eye Pier, Westminster Millennium Pier and Millbank Millennium Pier).

The pier has at its upstream end a small cruise terminal facility which is used for processing passengers and baggage transferred by boat from cruise ships berthed alongside HMS Belfast. The Tower Pier project was part of an integrated transport and regeneration strategy for the Thames led by London's Cross River Partnership.

Connections
Tower Hill tube station and Tower Gateway DLR station, Fenchurch Street railway station   
Tower Bridge Quay on the other side of Tower Bridge for Crown River Cruises
London Buses routes 15 and N15

Lifeboat pier move
In 2002 the Royal National Lifeboat Institution's Thames lifeboat service was introduced to the River Thames following the Marchioness disaster, and Tower Pier was initially used as a base for the lifeboat service. In 2006 the RNLI station moved up-river to a new base, the former Waterloo Police Pier on Victoria Embankment next to Waterloo Bridge, which took the name Tower Lifeboat Station.

Images

Lines

References

External links

Buildings and structures celebrating the third millennium
London River Services
Piers in London
Tower of London
Transport in the London Borough of Tower Hamlets
Transport infrastructure completed in 2000
2000 establishments in England